Chris Hakel (born August 9, 1969) is a former professional American football quarterback and current coach.

Hakel is the former head coach at Mechanicsburg High School, where his coaching record was 35-70 in 10 seasons. He resigned at the end of the 2016 season after leading the Mechanicsburg Wildcats to two consecutive 0-10 seasons. Hakel is now a member of the coaching staff at Red Land High School in nearby Lewisberry, Pennsylvania.

High school
Chris attended Mechanicsburg Area Senior High School. In 1987, he led the team to their first District 3-AAAA Football Championship. Besides playing quarterback, he played safety and punted as well.

College career
As a collegiate quarterback at the William and Mary, he led the leading offense in NCAA Division I-AA.  He held the school's single-season passing record of 3,414 yards until  Lang Campbell broke it in 2004.

Professional career
In 1992, Chris was drafted in the 4th Round (#112) in the NFL Draft, by the Washington Redskins. He was put on injured reserves for the season.  In the 1993 pre-season Hakel was given a second shot by the Redskins but was cut by the Redskins and was signed by the Atlanta Falcons and was on the practice squad. After being cut by the Falcons, the Kansas City Chiefs signed Hakel to the 1994 53 man roster.

References

1969 births
William & Mary Tribe football players
American football quarterbacks
Washington Redskins players
Atlanta Falcons players
Kansas City Chiefs players
Living people
People from Kanawha County, West Virginia